

Championships

Professional
Men
1995 NBA Finals:  Houston Rockets over the Orlando Magic 4-0.  MVP:  Hakeem Olajuwon
 1995 NBA Playoffs
1994–95 NBA season
1995 NBA draft
1995 NBA All-Star Game
Eurobasket:   Yugoslavia 	96, Lithuania 90
Women
Eurobasket Women: Ukraine def. Italy

College
Men
NCAA
Division I:  UCLA 89, Arkansas 79
NIT:  Virginia Tech def. Marquette University
Division II: 	University of Southern Indiana 71, UC Riverside 63
Division III: Wis.-Platteville 69, Manchester 55
NAIA
Division I Birmingham-Southern College AL 92, Pfeiffer University NC 76
Division II Albertson (Idaho) 81, Whitworth (Wash.) 72 OT
NJCAA
Division I Sullivan College, Louisville, KY 103, Allegany CC, Cumberland, MD 98 O/T
Division II Penn Valley CC, Mo. 93, Kishwukee CC, Ill. 88
Division III Sullivan County CC 74, Gloucester County College 63
Women
NCAA
Division I:  University of Tennessee 83, University of Georgia 65
Division II: North Dakota State 104, Shippensburg 78
Division III: Wis.-Oshkosh 66  Mount Union 50
NAIA
Division I: Southern Nazarene (Okla.) 80, Southeastern Oklahoma State University 79
Division II Western Oregon 80, Huron (S.D.) 77
NJCAA
Division I Trinity Valley CC 69, Independence CC 55
Division II Lansing CC 74, Kankakee CC 68
Division III Central Lakes College-Brainerd 71, Monroe CC 57

Awards and honors

Professional
Men
NBA Most Valuable Player Award:   David Robinson, San Antonio Spurs
NBA Rookie of the Year Award:  Grant Hill, Detroit Pistons ; Jason Kidd, Dallas Mavericks (tie)
NBA Defensive Player of the Year Award:  Dikembe Mutombo, Denver Nuggets
NBA Coach of the Year Award: Del Harris, Los Angeles Lakers

Collegiate 
 Men
John R. Wooden Award: Ed O'Bannon, UCLA
Naismith College Coach of the Year: Jim Harrick, UCLA
Frances Pomeroy Naismith Award: Tyus Edney, UCLA
Associated Press College Basketball Player of the Year: Joe Smith, Maryland
NCAA basketball tournament Most Outstanding Player: Tony Delk, Kentucky
Associated Press College Basketball Coach of the Year: Kelvin Sampson, Oklahoma
Naismith Outstanding Contribution to Basketball: Victor Bubas
 Women
Naismith College Player of the Year: Rebecca Lobo, Connecticut
Naismith College Coach of the Year: Geno Auriemma, Connecticut
Wade Trophy: Rebecca Lobo, Connecticut
Frances Pomeroy Naismith Award: Amy Dodrill, Johns Hopkins
Associated Press Women's College Basketball Player of the Year: Rebecca Lobo, Connecticut
NCAA basketball tournament Most Outstanding Player: Rebecca Lobo, UConn
Basketball Academic All-America Team: Rebecca Lobo, UConn
Carol Eckman Award: Ceal Barry, Colorado
Associated Press College Basketball Coach of the Year: Geno Auriemma, Connecticut

Naismith Memorial Basketball Hall of Fame 
Class of 1995:
Kareem Abdul-Jabbar
Anne Donovan
John Kundla
Vern Mikkelsen
Cheryl Miller
George Yardley

Movies
The Basketball Diaries
Slam Dunk Ernest

Births
 February 25 — Mario Hezonja, Croatian professional basketball player for Orlando Magic

Deaths
 January 7 — Art Stoefen, American NBL player (born 1914)
 January 18 — Cliff Fagan, former president of the Basketball Hall of Fame (born 1911)
 February 12 — Nat Holman, Hall of Fame player for the Original Celtics and coach of the 1950 NCAA and NIT champion CCNY Beavers (born 1896)
 February 20 — Margaret Wade, women's player and coach at Delta State University (born 1912)
 March 16 — Art Mollner, member of 1936 US Olympic championship team (born 1912)
 April 4 — Joe Richey, All-American at BYU (born 1931)
 April 13 — Mal McMullen, American NBA player (Indianapolis Olympians) (born 1927)
 April 17 — Jay McCreary, American college coach (LSU) (born 1918)
 April 28 — Walter Devlin, American NBA player (Fort Wayne Pistons, Minneapolis Lakers) (born 1931)
 May 25 — Krešimir Ćosić, Hall of Fame Croatian player.  First foreign player to earn collegiate All-American status while at Brigham Young University (born 1911)
 June 12 — Pierre Russell, American ABA player (Kentucky Colonels) (born 1949)
 July 21 — Tarzan Woltzen, American NBL player (born 1905)
 July 23 — Chuck Hanger, America AAU player (born 1924)
 August 21 — Hal Cihlar, American NBL player (born 1914)
 August 25 — John Mills, American BAA player (Pittsburgh Ironmen) (born 1919)
 November 3 — Cookie Cunningham, American college coach (Washington and Lee, North Dakota) (born 1905)
 December 12 — Jack Friel, American college coach (Washington State) (born 1898)

References